Sí, mi amor (English title: Yes, my love) is a Mexican telenovela produced by Guillermo Diazayas for Televisa in 1984. Is a remake of the Venezuelan telenovela La hija de nadie produced by RCTV in 1982.

Edith González, Leonardo Daniel and Luis Mario Quiroz star as the protagonists, while Nubia Marti and Gustavo Rojo star as the antagonists.

Cast 
Edith González as Susana
Leonardo Daniel as David Kendall
Luis Mario Quiroz as Carlos
Nubia Marti as Constanza
Gustavo Rojo as Sr. Williams
Rafael Baledón as Capitán O'Hara
Lucy Gallardo as Sra. Margot Williams
Javier Marc as Heriberto
Luis Miranda as Arnulfo
Arturo Alegro as Don Ignacio
Rosa María Moreno as Julia
Renata Flores as Edith
Tere Valadés as Sra. Tovar
José Roberto Hill as Pablo
Luis Avendaño as Victor
Patsy as Liz
Evangelina Martínez as Clotilde
Alberto Trejo Juárez as Jarocho
Silvia Manríquez as Leticia
Socorro Bonilla as Alicia
Felicia Mercado as Lady Simpson
Sergio Orrante as Tano
Carlos Enrique Torres as Pedro
José Carlos Teruén as Paul
José Dupeyrón as Mayordomo

References

External links 

Mexican telenovelas
1984 telenovelas
Televisa telenovelas
1984 Mexican television series debuts
1984 Mexican television series endings
Mexican television series based on Venezuelan television series
Spanish-language telenovelas